{{DISPLAYTITLE:C14H12ClNO2}}
The molecular formula C14H12ClNO2 (molar mass : 261.70 g/mol) may refer to :
 Cicletanine, a furopyridine low-ceiling diuretic drug, usually used in the treatment of hypertension
 Tolfenamic acid, a nonsteroidal anti-inflammatory drug used to treat the symptoms of migraine